Jiffy may refer to:

Business
 Jiffy (convenience store), a convenience store brand in Thailand
 Jiffy Packaging, a British packaging manufacturer
 Jiffy Steamer, an American manufacturer of clothing steamers
 Jiffy mix, a line of baking mixes manufactured by the Chelsea Milling Company

Other uses
 Jiffy (time), one of several different very short periods of time
 Jonathan Davies (rugby, born 1962), nicknamed "Jiffy"

See also
 Jiffy Lube, a US brand of automotive oil change shops
 Jiffy Pop, a brand of popcorn
 "Jiffy lemons", the plastic lemon-shaped containers used to package Jif (lemon juice)
 Jiffy bag, another name for padded envelopes
 Jif (disambiguation)